The 1998–99 Northern Counties East Football League season was the 17th in the history of Northern Counties East Football League, a football competition in England.

Premier Division

The Premier Division featured 17 clubs which competed in the previous season, along with three new clubs.
Clubs promoted from Division One:
Garforth Town
Staveley Miners Welfare

Plus:
Buxton, relegated from the Northern Premier League

League table

Division One

Division One featured 12 clubs which competed in the previous season, along with one new club:
Hatfield Main, relegated from the Premier Division

League table

Cup Competitions

League Cup

President's Cup
 North Ferriby United beat Garforth Town 6–1 on aggregate

Wilkinson's Sword Trophy
For first division teams

 Yorkshire Amateur beat Parkgate 8–2 on aggregate

References

The Official Football Association Non League Club Directory 2000

External links
 Northern Counties East Football League

1998–99
8